The 34th century BC was a century that lasted from the year 3400 BC to 3301 BC.

Cultures
Stage IIIa2 of the Naqada culture in Egypt (dated in 1998).
Archaic forms of cuneiform emerge in the late Uruk period in Mesopotamia.
Burial of a child at Ashleypark Burial Mound, Ireland (c. 3350 BC)

Religion
 Enoch

References

 
-6
-66